Sophora flavescens, the shrubby sophora, is a species of plant in the genus Sophora of the family Fabaceae. This genus contains about 52 species, nineteen varieties, and seven forms that are widely distributed in Asia, Oceania, and the Pacific islands. About fifteen of these species have a long history of use in traditional Chinese medicines.

Growth and cultivation
The plant prefers light (sandy), medium (loamy) and heavy (clay) soils and requires well-drained soil. The plant prefers acid, neutral and basic (alkaline) soils. It cannot grow in the shade. It requires moist soil. Like many other species in the family Fabaceae, this species can fix nitrogen.

Chemistry

Chemical compounds isolated from S. flavescens include:
 Matrine and matrine oxide, quinolizidine alkaloids found in the roots
 Kushenin, a pterocarpan and isoflavonoid
 Sophoraflavanone G
 7,9,2',4'-Tetrahydroxy-8-isopentenyl-5-methoxychalcone
 Sophoridine
 Kurarinone
 Trifolirhizin, a pterocarpan flavonoid, isolated from the roots
 8-Prenylkaempferol, a prenylflavonoid
 Oxysophocarpine and sophocarpine, alkaloids

Toxicity
Toxic effects from use of the root may include nausea, dizziness, vomiting, constipation, spasms, disturbance of speech, irregular breathing, respiratory failure and death.

References

External links
Sophora flavescens Ait. 

flavescens
Plants used in traditional Chinese medicine